Al Ittihad Alexandria Club, simply known as Al Ittihad, is an Egyptian sports club based in Alexandria, Egypt. The club is mainly known for its professional football team, which currently plays in the Egyptian Premier League, the highest league in the Egyptian football league system.

Founded in 1914 in Alexandria, the club is one of the oldest and most popular football clubs in Egypt. Al Ittihad was the first club that rushed to endorse the idea of founding the Egyptian Football Association in 1921, which significantly contributed to increasing the club's popularity in Alexandria and his famous Chairman was Tawfik Abouhashem.

Highlights
1906 Establishment of a club under the name of the club of the Union headed by Hassan Ismail.
1908 Change the name of the club from Union club to the Union National Club.
1910 Creation of United Champions Club headed by Abu Zeidi.
1912 Abdo El Hamami heads the United Champions Club.
1912 The merger of the National Union Club with El Haditha club under the name of the modern club headed by Hassan Rasmi, and this club became the strongest football club in Alexandria.
1914 The merger of El Haditha club with the United Champions Club under the name of Al Ittihad Club and so the name of Al Ittihad Club reappeared.
1918 The merger of Al Ittihad Club with the Alexandria Club under the name of Al Ittihad Club of Alexandria headed by Mohammed Shaheen.
2014 As Al Ittihad club was celebrating their year number (100) A match was held for Al Ittihad Club of Alexandria in the Alexandria Stadium against Sporting Lisbon, Portugal, and ended the match with a positive draw 2–2.

Kits and colours

Kit manufacturers

Kits gallery

Honours

Egypt Cup: 6
 1926, 1935–36, 1948, 1963, 1973, 1976
Sultan Hussein Cup: 1 
 1935

Regional
Alexandria Zone League: 27 (record)
 From 1927 to 1953

Performance in CAF competitions
FR = First round
SR = Second round
QF = Quarter-final
SF = Semi-final

Notes

Performance in domestic competitions

Players

Current squad

Out on loan

All time top Egyptian Premier League Scorers

Board of directors 

Source:

Managers

 Diethelm Ferner (1 July 2000 – 30 June 2002)
 Mohamed Omar (Jan 2002 – 2 July)
 Rainer Zobel (4 November 2002 – 31 December 2003)
 Mohamed Omar (May 2003 – 4 April)
 Mohamed Salah (July 2004 – 4 Oct)
 Slobodan Pavković (July 2006 – 6 Dec)
 Mohamed Omar (Dec 2006 – 7 Aug)
 Mohamed Salah (Sept 2007 – 8 Jan)
 Taha Basry (1 January 2008 – 26 August 2009)
 Cabralzinho (4 September 2009 – 21 November 2010)
 Mohamed Amer (22 November 2010 – 6 April 2011)
 Ahmed Sary (April 2011)
 José Maqueda (2 August 2011 – 1 December 2012)
 Ahmed Sary (16 December 2012 – 12 March 2013)
 Jose Kléber (20 March 2013 – 12 May 2013)
 Ahmed Sary (12 May 2013 – 22 July 2013)
 Talaat Youssef (23 July 2013 – 16 December 2013)
 Mounir Oukala (interim) (21 December 2013 – 31 December 2013)
 Denis Lavagne (31 December 2013–14)
 Talaat Youssef (Aug 2014 – Oct 2014)
 Hossam Hassan (Oct 2014 – July 2015)
 Stoycho Mladenov (July 2015 – Nov 2015)
 Leonel Pontes (Nov 2015 – March 2016)
 Mokhtar Mokhtar (March 2016 – Feb 2017)
 José Maqueda (February 2017 – 2018)
 Talaat Youssef (Jun 2019 – Oct 2020)
 Mounir Oukala (interim) (Oct 2020 – Oct 2020)
 Hossam Hassan (Oct 2020 – March 2022)
 Emad El Nahhas (March 2022 – Present)

See also
 Egyptian Premier League
 Egypt Cup
 Sultan Hussein Cup

References

External links
 Official site
article about Al Ittihad club after 100 year of creation
Al Ittihad club's history

 
1914 establishments in Egypt
Association football clubs established in 1914
Football clubs in Alexandria